The Mayor of Newark is the head of the executive branch of government of Newark, New Jersey, United States. The mayor has the duty to enforce the municipal charter and ordinances; prepare the annual budget; appoint deputy mayors, department heads, and aides; and approve or veto ordinances passed by the Municipal Council.

Newark, New Jersey, was founded in 1666 and became a township on October 31, 1693, and granted a Royal charter on April 27, 1713. It was incorporated by an act of the New Jersey Legislature on February 21, 1798, and reincorporated as city in 1836. The city is governed within the Faulkner Act, formally known as the Optional Municipal Charter Law, under the Mayor-Council Plan C form of local government, which became effective as of July 1, 1954, after the voters of the city passed a referendum held on November 3, 1953.

The Mayor of Newark is elected for a four-year term. Municipal elections (for mayor and Municipal Council) are nonpartisan and are held on the 2nd Tuesday in May. The 2018 Newark mayoral election took place on May 8, 2018.

The current mayor Ras Baraka was first elected in the Newark mayoral election on May 13, 2014.

Mayors

See also
List of elected officials in Newark, New Jersey
2014 Newark mayoral election
History of Newark, New Jersey

References

 
Newark